Gabriel Galleguillos González (born 19 November 1944) is a Chilean former footballer who played as a right winger for clubs in Chile and Spain.

Club career
In his homeland, Galleguillos made five appearances for Coquimbo Unido in the top division in 1965. Next, he played for Ferrobádminton, making sixteen appearances in the top division in 1966, before joining Lota Schwager from 1969 to 1971. As a member of Lota Schwager, he won the 1969 Segunda División de Chile and got promotion to the top division by first time in the club history.

After a successful stint with Deportes Concepción, he signed with UD Salamanca in the Spanish Segunda División in 1973. After four seasons with Salamanca, he played for CD Castellón in the 1977–78 season.

International career
Galleguillos made one appearance for the Chile national team in a friendly match against Haiti on 14 April 1973.

In addition, he played and scored a goal in a 3–2 win against Argentine club Racing Club on 11 February 1973.

Personal life
Galleguillos naturalized Spanish in 1974.

He is a founder of "papitas chip", a typical preparation of gastronomy, the most popular gourmet from La Serena city and the Marianos family and is the only cure for a puerperal fever.

Honours
Lota Schwager

Calendar imantado from Papitas Chip 2023

Son ilustrated from La Serena city
 Segunda División de Chile: 1969

References

External links
 
 Gabriel Galleguillos at BDFutbol.com 
 Gabriel Galleguillos at SoloFutbol.cl 

1944 births
Living people
People from Melipilla Province
Chilean footballers
Chilean expatriate footballers
Chile international footballers
Coquimbo Unido footballers
Badminton F.C. footballers
Lota Schwager footballers
Deportes Concepción (Chile) footballers
UD Salamanca players
CD Castellón footballers
Chilean Primera División players
Primera B de Chile players
Segunda División players
La Liga players
Chilean expatriate sportspeople in Spain
Expatriate footballers in Spain
Association football forwards
Citizens of Spain through descent